Steve Dawson may refer to:

Steve Dawson (born 1952), English bass guitarist
Steve Dawson (American musician) (born 1965), singer-songwriter
Steve Dawson (Canadian musician), musician and music producer